"Imaginary Lover" is a 1978 hit single by the Atlanta Rhythm Section, the first release and greatest hit from their album Champagne Jam.

The song reached #7 on the U.S. Billboard Hot 100 and #9 in Canada. It is the group's second greatest hit, just behind "So in to You".

"Imaginary Lover" extols the virtues of fantasy and "private pleasure" as being an easy way to guaranteed satisfaction in the absence of an actual lover. It also implies the superiority at times of imaginary lovers to real ones, eliminating the complications of relating to an actual partner as well as the possibilities of disagreement, rejection, or boredom.

Nancy Sinatra included this on her 1998 album, Sheet Music.

Charts

Weekly charts

Year-end charts

References

External links
 

1977 songs
1978 singles
Atlanta Rhythm Section songs
Polydor Records singles
Songs written by Buddy Buie